Athous apfelbecki is a species of click beetle from the family Elateridae. The species is found in the Balkans, including countries like, Bulgaria, Hungary, Romania, and former Yugoslavian states.

References

Beetles described in 1905
Beetles of Europe
Dendrometrinae